Sarcodon illudens is a species of tooth fungus in the family Bankeraceae. It was described in 1976 by Dutch mycologist Rudolph Arnold Maas Geesteranus, from collections made in France.

References

External links

Fungi described in 1976
Fungi of Europe
illudens